Beirut attack may refer to:

1975-1976 Battle of the Hotels
1978 Hundred Days' War
1981 Iraqi embassy bombing in Beirut
Bombing of Lebanon (July 1981), including Bombing of Beirut
1982 Siege of Beirut
1982 Beirut bombing
1982 Sabra and Shatila massacre
1983 Beirut barracks bombings
1983 United States embassy bombing in Beirut
1984 United States embassy annex bombing in Beirut
1985 Beirut car bombings
War of Camps (19 May 1985 – July 1988)
War of Liberation (1989–1990) including War in East Beirut
2005 Assassination of Rafic Hariri
2006 Chyah airstrike
2007 Beirut Arab University shooting
October 2012 Beirut bombing
2013 Iranian embassy bombing in Beirut
August 2013 Beirut bombing
2015 Beirut bombings
2019 Beirut drone crash
2020 Beirut explosion
2021 Beirut clashes

See also
List of attacks in Lebanon
 Beirut bombings (disambiguation)